South East Durham was a county constituency represented in the House of Commons of the Parliament of the United Kingdom. It elected one Member of Parliament (MP) by the first past the post system of election between 1885 and 1918.

History

Creation 
The constituency was created by the Redistribution of Seats Act 1885, when the North Durham and South Durham county divisions were replaced by eight new single-member county constituencies. These were Barnard Castle, Bishop Auckland, Chester-le-Street, Houghton-le-Spring, Jarrow, Mid Durham, North West Durham and South East Durham. In addition there were seven County Durham borough constituencies.

Boundaries 

 The Sessional Divisions of Castle Eden (exclusive of any part of the parish of Shadforth), Darlington, Seaham Harbour (part), Stockton-on-Tees, and West Hartlepool; and
 the Municipal Boroughs of Darlington, Hartlepool, and Stockton-on-Tees.

See map on Vision of Britain website.

NB: 1) Boundary Commission proposed name was "North Tees".

2) Included only non-resident freeholders in the parliamentary boroughs of Darlington, Stockton-on-Tees and The Hartlepools.

Abolition 
The seat was abolished for the 1918 general election, when its contents were distributed as follows:

 northern areas, now part of the Rural District of Easington to the new constituency of Seaham; and
 southern areas, now part of the Rural Districts of Darlington, Hartlepool, Sedgefield and Stockton (including Billingham) to the new constituency of Sedgefield.

Members of Parliament

Election results

Elections in the 1880s

Elections in the 1890s

Elections in the 1900s

Elections in the 1910s 

General Election 1914–15:

Another General Election was required to take place before the end of 1915. The political parties had been making preparations for an election to take place and by the July 1914, the following candidates had been selected; 
Liberal: Evan Hayward
Unionist: Rowland Burdon
Labour:

See also
History of parliamentary constituencies and boundaries in Durham

References 

 

Parliamentary constituencies in County Durham (historic)
Constituencies of the Parliament of the United Kingdom established in 1885
Constituencies of the Parliament of the United Kingdom disestablished in 1918